The 1980 Oakland Athletics season was the team's thirteenth season in Oakland. The A's, under first-year manager Billy Martin, began the season with low expectations following their insipid 1979 campaign. Strong performances from pitchers Mike Norris, Matt Keough, and Rick Langford, along with the brilliant play of breakout star (and future Hall-of-Famer) Rickey Henderson, paved the way for a staggering 29-win increase over the previous year's output. The Athletics, only one year removed from baseball's worst record, swung to a second-place finish behind their 83-79 record.

The season also marked the end of the Charlie Finley ownership era. Finley sold the team to Walter A. Haas, Jr. shortly before the start of the 1981 season. The A's would remain under Haas' ownership until 1995.

Offseason 
 March 21, 1980: Jim Todd was released by the Athletics.
 March 21, 1980: Joe Wallis was released by the Athletics.

Regular season 
In 1980, Charlie O. Finley hired Billy Martin to manage the young team. The club was led by new young stars Rickey Henderson, Mike Norris, Tony Armas, and Dwayne Murphy. The starting pitching staff was also notable in that they completed 94 starts, virtually unheard of in the era of the relief pitcher. Rick Langford finished 28 of his 33 starts, totalling nearly 300 innings, and tallying a 19-12 record. Norris went 22-9 with a 2.53 ERA, completed 24 starts, and was runner-up to Steve Stone in the Cy Young Award balloting that year. Martin made believers of his young charges as "Billyball" (characterized as featuring aggressive base running) was used to market the team, and the Athletics finished second in 1980.

Rickey Henderson broke Ty Cobb's American League record for most stolen bases in one season (96) by recording 100 stolen bases.

Season standings

Record vs. opponents

Notable transactions 
 April 10, 1980: Randy Elliott was signed as a free agent by the Athletics.

Draft picks 
 June 3, 1980: Rich Bordi was drafted by the Athletics in the 3rd round of the 1980 Major League Baseball Draft.

Roster

Player stats

Batting

Starters by position 
Note: Pos = Position; G = Games played; AB = At bats; H = Hits; Avg. = Batting average; HR = Home runs; RBI = Runs batted in

Other batters 
Note: G = Games played; AB = At bats; H = Hits; Avg. = Batting average; HR = Home runs; RBI = Runs batted in

Pitching

Starting pitchers 
Note: G = Games pitched; IP = Innings pitched; W = Wins; L = Losses; ERA = Earned run average; SO = Strikeouts

Other pitchers 
Note: G = Games pitched; IP = Innings pitched; W = Wins; L = Losses; ERA = Earned run average; SO = Strikeouts

Relief pitchers 
Note: G = Games pitched; W = Wins; L = Losses; SV = Saves; ERA = Earned run average; SO = Strikeouts

Awards and honors 
 Billy Martin, Associated Press AL Manager of the Year

League records 
 Rickey Henderson, American League record (since broken), Most stolen bases in one season (100)

League leaders 
 Rickey Henderson, American League leader, stolen bases (100)

Farm system

References

External links
1980 Oakland Athletics team page at Baseball Reference
1980 Oakland Athletics team page at www.baseball-almanac.com

Oakland Athletics seasons
Oakland Athletics season
Oak